William "Will" Coleman III (born May 8, 1983 in Locust Valley, New York) is an American equestrian. At the 2012 Summer Olympics he competed in the Individual eventing and Team eventing. At the age of six, Coleman's family moved to Charlottesville, VA where he started riding. His first horse was a Shetland pony that arrived in the bed of a pickup truck. Coleman soon started riding in the hunt fields of Virginia Piedmont Hunt where he learned the fundamentals of horse back riding. His father was his first show jumping coach, being an avid fox hunter and horseman in his own right. As his love for eventing grew he started training with Olympic veterans Karen and David O’Connor regularly.  After graduating from Woodberry Forest School in 2001, Coleman took an apprenticeship with the O’Connors.

In 2001 at the age of 18, Coleman was gold medalist at the North American Young Rider's Championship. When he turned 19 he moved up to the three-star level and finished 8th on his horse Second Hope at Fair Hill International CCI3*, earning a spot on the USEF's winter training list. In 2003, Coleman and Fox In Flight traveled abroad to the Bramham CCI3* where the combination won the under-25 Championships, becoming the only US combination to ever do so. The pair stayed in England to compete in their first CCI4* at Burghley where the pair jumped a clean cross country round and finished 26th out of more than 100 starters.

At the age of 20, Coleman was listed as a contender for a spot on the US Olympic team in Athens. Unfortunately Fox In Flight was injured right before Rolex Kentucky in the spring of 2004, putting him out of contention for the 2004 Olympics. However, Coleman had a second ride at Rolex Kentucky in 2004 on Second Hope. This would be his first attempt at Americas only four-star, where he finished as the top placed young rider.

In the Fall of 2005 Coleman began his college education at University of Virginia, leading to the sale of some of his top horses, leaving him with just a few young horses and Second Hope. At this time in his life he took a step back from completing to focus on his education. During his time away from competing he continued to focus on his riding education, taking lessons from many world famous riders such as Gerd Reuter in dressage, and Anne Kursinski and Wiljan Laraakers in show jumping.

In 2012 Will places fourth on Twizzel at Rolex Kentucky CCI4* and earned a spot on the team US London Olympic team.

In 2021, Coleman won the CHIO Aachen Nations Cup aboard Off the Record. He became the first American event rider to win in Aachen.

Notable Accolades 

 2015 Blenheim CCI3* 11th – OBOS O’Reilly
 2015 Rolex Kentucky CCI4* 6th Place Overall and USEF National Reserve Champion, Best Turned Out, Best Conditioned, and Land Rover Best Ride of the Day – OBOS O’Reilly
 2014 USEF NATIONAL LIST – Conair and OBOS O’Reilly
 2013 Fair Hill CCI3* 3rd – Conair
 2013 USEF WORLD CLASS LIST – OBOS O’Reilly
 2013 Bromont CCI3* 1st – OBOS O’Reilly
 2013 Fair Hill International CIC3* 1st – OBOS O’Reilly
 2012 Olympic Games 37th – Twizzel
 2012 USEF Olympic Games Short List
 2011 USEF High Performance B-List – Twizzel
 2011 Fair Hill CCI3* 4th – Twizzel
 2011 Barbury International CIC3* 7th – Twizzel
 2011 USEF Pan American Games Short List – OBOS O’Reilly
 2010 Red Hills CIC3* World Cup Qualifier 3rd – Nevada Bay
 2010 USEF High Performance A-List on Twizzel
 2009 Luhmuhlen CCI4* Germany 5th – Twizzel
 2009 USEF High Performance A List – Twizzel
 2008 Fair Hill International CCI3* 3rd – Twizzel
 2008 Planation Field CIC3* 1st – Twizzel
 2008 The Fork Horse Trials CIC3* 7th – Twizzel
 2008 American Eventing Championship Advanced 3rd – Twizzel
 2008 American Eventing Championship Intermediate 4th – Nevada Bay
 2007 Adequan Gold Cup Series 1st – Kiki du Manoir
 2006 USEF National CCI Championship – Kiki du Manoir
 2005 Luhmuhlen CCI4* Germany 16th – Second Hope, Second Highest Placed American
 2004 USEA Young Rider and Advanced Rider of the Year
 2004 USEF Olympic Games Short List – Fox In Flight
 2004 Rolex Kentucky CCI4* 19th -Second Hope
 2003 Bramham International U-25 CCI3* UK 1st – Fox In Flight
 2003 Chatsworth Advanced 1st – Second Hope
 2003 Chatsworth CIC3* – Fox-in-Flight
 2003 Burghley International CCI4* 26th – Fox in Flight
 2002 Fair Hill CCI3* 8th — Second Hope
 2001 NAYRC 1st – Ratzi

CCI***** Results

International Championship Results

References

American male equestrians
Olympic equestrians of the United States
Equestrians at the 2012 Summer Olympics
People from Locust Valley, New York
1983 births
Living people